Hasmizan Bin Kamarodin (born 24 January 1984, in Besut) is a Malaysian footballer who plays as a centre-back and former Malaysia national team player.

Club career

Kelantan FA
In December 2016, Hasmizan signed with east coast team, Kelantan FA after 6 years playing for his hometown team, Terengganu FA.

On 22 February 2017, Hasmizan made his debut during postponed match against Melaka United in Sultan Muhammad IV Stadium. He played side by side with Gambian Mamadou Danso as a left centre-back. Kelantan has lost during that match by 0–2 score.

International career
In August 2013, Hasmizan has been included in the Malaysia national team's training squad with training due to go on from September 1 to 6 at Wisma FAM, before they fly out to China on Sept 7 for an international “A” friendly against the Chinese national team at the Tianjin Olympic Centre Stadium on Sept 10. However, Hasmizan has had to withdraw and miss the chance of earning his first-ever international cap due to a hamstring injury picked up in the Malaysia Cup match against Pahang FA.

Career statistics

Club statistics
As of 28 October 2017.

References

External links
 

1984 births
Living people
Malaysian footballers
Terengganu FC players
 Kelantan FA players
People from Terengganu
Malaysian people of Malay descent
Association football central defenders